Daniel Nepomuceno Navarro (born August 22, 1991) is an American professional soccer player of Brazilian descent who currently plays as a defender for North Carolina FC in USL League One.

Career

Professional
After time playing in Brazil, Navarro moved to North American Soccer League side Fort Lauderdale Strikers on April 3, 2015.

On December 4, 2016 Sport Club São Paulo announced the signing of the player for the Campeonato Gaúcho 2017 and Campeonato Brasileiro Série D 2017.

In September 2018, Navarro was announced as a new acquisition for USL Championship side El Paso Locomotive FC ahead of their inaugural season in 2019. He was later loaned to USL League One side Chattanooga Red Wolves SC in July 2019 for the remainder of the season.

In February 2020, Navarro signed with Oakland Roots SC of the National Independent Soccer Association.

On February 6, 2021, Navarro returned to Chattanooga Red Wolves on a permanent deal. 

Navarro missed the first half of the 2022 season with injury, but returned to help with the club's run to the league playoff final. At the end of the 2022 season, he was given All League First Team honors and announced as a finalist for USL League One Defender of the Year.

On December 12, 2022, Navarro signed with North Carolina FC as a free agent.

References

External links 
 Fort Lauderdale Strikers Profile.
 DEMA, LEOMIR AND NAVARRO! IT'S THE LION READY FOR THE GAUCHÃO!.
 With another scenario, Gilson has a challenging season.

1991 births
Living people
American soccer players
Chattanooga Red Wolves SC players
Fort Lauderdale Strikers players
El Paso Locomotive FC players
Oakland Roots SC players
North Carolina FC players
Association football defenders
North American Soccer League players
Soccer players from Massachusetts
Sport Club São Paulo
People from Hyannis, Massachusetts
Sportspeople from Barnstable County, Massachusetts
USL Championship players
USL League One players
National Independent Soccer Association players